Mauriq Hill (Born 22 July 1995, Hamilton, Bermuda) is a Bermudian footballer who plays for the Bermuda national football team. He plays in midfield, although has been known to play as a defender.

Career

From the age of 14, Hill was playing for Bermudian Premier Division side Devonshire Cougars, as well as the Bermuda U-17s. In 2014, he began to play for Clemson Tigers, at the university in which he is majoring in management, where he was given the Number 5 shirt. Prior to the 2017 season, Hill transferred from Clemson to the Pittsburgh Panthers

International career

Hill made his senior international debut on 6 March 2015 in a 2–2 draw against Grenada, where he received a yellow card. He played in his first win just 2 days later, also against Grenada. His last game for his country was against Saint Kitts and Nevis on 21 February 2016. Saint Kitts & Nevis proved 3–0 victors.

References

External links
Clemson Tigers bio
Pittsburgh Panthers bio
PDL bio

1995 births
Living people
Bermudian footballers
Bermudian expatriate footballers
Bermuda international footballers
Association football midfielders
Association football defenders
People from Hamilton, Bermuda
Clemson Tigers men's soccer players
USL League Two players
Expatriate soccer players in the United States
Pittsburgh Panthers men's soccer players
Bermuda under-20 international footballers
Bermuda youth international footballers